Conus queenslandis is a species of sea snail, a marine gastropod mollusk in the family Conidae, the cone snails and their allies.

Like all species within the genus Conus, these snails are predatory and venomous. They are capable of "stinging" humans, therefore live ones should be handled carefully or not at all.

Taxonomic relation 
Conus queenslandis was originally named as a subspecies of Conus tribblei Walls, 1977 but has been recognized as a valid species, alternative representation in the subgenus Splinoconus..

Description
The size of the shell varies between 60 mm and 110 mm.

Distribution
This marine species occurs off Vietnam,  New Caledonia and Queensland, Australia

References

 Motta, A.J. da 1984. Three new Conus species. La Conchiglia 16(178-179): 24-28 
 Wilson, B. (1994) Australian marine shells. Prosobranch gastropods. Vol. 2 Neogastropods. Odyssey Publishing, Kallaroo, Western Australia, 370 pp.
 Röckel, D., Korn, W. & Kohn, A.J. 1995. Manual of the Living Conidae. Volume 1: Indo-Pacific Region. Wiesbaden : Hemmen 517 pp.
 Röckel, D., Richard, G. & Moolenbeek, R.G. 1995. Deep-water Cones (Gastropoda: Conidae) from the New Caledonia region. In, Bouchet, P. (ed.). Résultats des Campagnes MUSORSTOM, Vol. 14. Mémoires de Muséum National d'Histoire Naturelle 167: 557-594
 Puillandre N., Duda T.F., Meyer C., Olivera B.M. & Bouchet P. (2015). One, four or 100 genera? A new classification of the cone snails. Journal of Molluscan Studies. 81: 1-23

External links
 To World Register of Marine Species
 Cone Shells - Knights of the Sea
 

queenslandis
Gastropods described in 1984